(born February 3, 1986 in Nakano, Tokyo, Japan) is a Japanese actress, comedian, and tarento, who has been featured in Cartoon KAT-TUN, the live-action drama Otomen, and collaborated on the music for Keroro Gunso the Super Movie 3: Keroro vs. Keroro Great Sky Duel. She is represented with Ohta Production.

Film
 Maboroshi no Yamataikoku (2008) as Tamago
 Giovanni's Island (2014)

Television
 Maru maru chibi maruko chan (Fuji TV/2007)
 Oniyome nikki: Ii yu da na (Fuji TV/2007)
 Nanase Once More (NHK/2008)
 Bakushō Reddo Kāpetto (2008)
 Otomen (Fuji TV/2009)
 Sora kara Nihon o Mite miyō, voice of Kumomi, (TV Tokyo/2009-2010)

References

External links
 Ohta Pro official profile 
 Official blog 

Japanese women comedians
Japanese actresses
1986 births
Living people